Mahama is an African given name and surname. People with this name include:

Given name
Mahama Awal, Cameroonian footballer
Mahama Ayariga, Ghanaian politician
Mahama Sawadogo, Burkinabé politician
Mahama Johnson Traoré, Senegalese film director and producer

Surname
Aliu Mahama, Ghanaian engineer and politician
Edward Mahama, Ghanaian physician and politician
Emmanuel Adama Mahama, Ghanaian politician and father of John Dramani
Ibrahim Mahama (born 1971), Ghanaian businessman, brother of John Dramani
John Dramani Mahama, Ghanaian politician and former president of Ghana

African given names
Surnames of African origin